Caroline Ryder (born, November 12, 1980) is a writer, based in Los Angeles, California, known for her work with LA Weekly, Dazed magazine and the Los Angeles Times and for co-authoring Dirty Rocker Boys, named among the "50 greatest rock memoirs of all time" by Rolling Stone magazine.

Journalism
Born to an Irish father and Brazilian mother in Madrid, Spain, she was raised in London, England and educated at Haberdashers' Aske's School for Girls in Elstree. She graduated from the London School of Economics, working at MTV Europe and Warner Music before moving to Los Angeles in 2005. After meeting street artist Shepard Fairey at a nightclub in Hollywood, she became an editor for his magazine Swindle, interviewing members of the IRA for a cover article on pro-terrorism murals, as well as Black Panther Bobby Seale, actress Pam Grier, porn publisher Larry Flynt, singer Nancy Sinatra and Larry Clark.

Known for her coverage of the LA indie music and fashion scenes, she became one of the LA Weekly 's first fashion bloggers. In 2007, she was hired by the Los Angeles Times to act as style editor of their youth culture portal, Metromix. She was named style editor of Variety until being laid off in 2008.

In 2010, Odd Future granted Ryder their first print interview, which was published in the LA Weekly.

In 2012, she became a columnist for KCET's Artbound.

In 2015, she conducted the first solo interview with Yolandi Visser of Die Antwoord for Dazed magazine.

Books
Co-author of the 2015 Gwar biography Let There Be Gwar.
Co-authored the Sunset Strip memoir Dirty Rocker Boys and, "Cherry on Top: Flirty, Forty-Something, and Funny as F*ck," alongside Bobbie Brown. 
Co-author of Kicking Up Dirt with X Games champion Ashley Fiolek.

Film
In 2013, it was announced that Sony Films was developing an adaptation of Kicking Up Dirt.

Her feature script Mimi and Ulrich, written under the mentorship of Mary Sweeney and Udo Kier, was shortlisted for the 2015 Sundance Screenwriting Lab.

She is a graduate of USC's School of Cinematic Arts, where she gained her MFA in Writing for Screen and Television.

References

External links
Laweekly.com
Laweekly.com
Nationalrockreview.com
Deadline.com
Kcet.org

Alumni of the London School of Economics
People educated at Haberdashers' Girls' School
Living people
English writers
Writers from Los Angeles
Writers from London
USC School of Cinematic Arts alumni
1980 births